Masaru Yamada (山田優, Yamada Masaru, born 14 June 1994) is a Japanese right-handed épée fencer, 2016 team Asian champion, 2019 individual Asian champion, and 2021 team Olympic champion.

Along with Koki Kano, Kazuyasu Minobe, and Satoru Uyama, Yamada was a member of the Japanese team that won gold in the team men's épée event at the 2020 Tokyo Olympic Games. It was Japan's first Olympic gold medal in fencing.

Medal Record

Olympic Games

World Championship

Asian Championship

Grand Prix

References

External links 
 

Living people
1994 births
People from Mie Prefecture
Sportspeople from Mie Prefecture
Japanese male épée fencers
Fencers at the 2014 Asian Games
Fencers at the 2018 Asian Games
Medalists at the 2014 Asian Games
Medalists at the 2018 Asian Games
Asian Games gold medalists for Japan
Asian Games silver medalists for Japan
Asian Games medalists in fencing
Universiade medalists in fencing
Universiade bronze medalists for Japan
Medalists at the 2017 Summer Universiade
Fencers at the 2020 Summer Olympics
Olympic fencers of Japan
Olympic gold medalists for Japan
Medalists at the 2020 Summer Olympics
Olympic medalists in fencing
20th-century Japanese people
21st-century Japanese people
World Fencing Championships medalists